Bekikang: Ang Nanay Kong Beki is a 2013 Filipino drama comedy film with an LGBT theme, directed by Wenn V. Deramas.

Plot
The drama-comedy Filipino film depicts Bekikang or Beki (Joey Paras) and his friends. This was inspired by the life story of the late director Wenn Deramas.  As Beki was bullied for being gay as he was growing up, his father (Tirso Cruz III) taught him to defend himself in fights. Beki is a caring, responsible and hardworking fellow of the family. He is a balut vendor along with his friends. One day, Beki and his friends catch a new stud in town who is in trouble and needs help from being bullied. Beki steps up for the good-looking Fortunato (Tom Rodriguez) who becomes his love interest. However, Fortunato falls for the local waitress, Natalie (Carla Humphries), at a restaurant Beki takes him to. Beki soon becomes jealous of Natalie. Unfortunately, Fortunato gets Natalie pregnant and Beki becomes involved with raising their baby after Natalie decides to leave Fortunato to work in Japan. Beki accepts their baby as his own once he learns that Fortunato and Natalie have broken up. Fortunato also decides to leave the country to work. Beki's family is not too fond of Beki taking care of Fortunato's baby and this encourages Beki to leave their house to live with his friends. Soon, the three gay men raise the child under stable conditions until the comeback of the child's biological parents, Fortunato and Natalie. The couple is back together and they want their child back. Will Fortunato and Natalie be able to get their child back from Bekikang?

Cast

Main cast
 Joey Paras as Victorio "Beki"
Tom Rodriguez as Fortunato "Fortune"
 JM Ibañez as Fortunato Jr. "Potpot"
 Carla Humphries as Natalie

Supporting cast
 Tirso Cruz III as Gorio
 Lassy Marquez as Tomas
 Atak Arana as Entoy
 Nikki Valdez as Samantha
 Malou de Guzman as Anacleta
 Maricar de Mesa as Mariana
 Miguel Aguila as Mandy
 Manuel Chua as Dado
 Rubi Rubi as Lydia
 Jeff Luna as Lydia's Helper
 Debraliz as Trudis

Special participation
 Janice de Belen as Maristella
 Maricel Soriano as the Saleslady
 Andi Eigenmann as the Ice Cream Vendor
 Iza Calzado as the Doctor
 Dingdong Dantes as the Gay Passby
 Ate Gay as the Midwife
 Dey-Dey Amansec as Young Beki
 Bea Basa as Young Samantha
 Abby Bautista as Young Mariana
 Michael Roy Jornales as the Fight Instructor
 Frank Garcia as Samantha's Husband
 Carmen Del Rosario as Yaya/Helper
 Jhiz Deocareza as the Bully Kid
Eagle Riggs as the Gay Beauty Pageant Host

Sequel
A sequel was planned as seen from the ending of the movie. But not yet announced.

References

External links
 

Philippine LGBT-related films
2013 LGBT-related films
2013 films
Films directed by Wenn V. Deramas
LGBT-related comedy-drama films
Gay-related films